Pope Gabriel VI of Alexandria, was the 91st Pope of Alexandria and Patriarch of the See of St. Mark.

15th-century Coptic Orthodox popes of Alexandria
1474 deaths